The Netherlands Football League Championship 1945–1946 was contested by 66 teams participating in six divisions. The national champion would be determined by a play-off featuring the winners of the eastern, northern, two southern and two western football divisions of the Netherlands. HFC Haarlem won this year's championship by beating AFC Ajax, sc Heerenveen, NAC, NEC Nijmegen and Limburgia.

New entrants
Eerste Klasse East:
Promoted from 2nd Division: Be Quick Zutphen
Eerste Klasse North:
Promoted from 2nd Division: LAC Frisia 1883
Eerste Klasse South-I:
Moving in from the combined southern division from 1943-44: BVV Den Bosch, FC Eindhoven, LONGA, NAC, NOAD and Willem II
Promoted from 2nd Division: Baronie/DNL, RBC Roosendaal, RKTVV Tilburg, VC Vlissingen & VV Helmond
Eerste Klasse South-II: (new division)
Moving in from the combined southern division from 1943-44: Juliana, Maurits, MVV Maastricht, PSV Eindhoven, RFC Roermond and De Spechten
Promoted from 2nd Division: Bleijerheide, Brabantia, Limburgia, SC Emma & VVV Venlo
Eerste Klasse West-I:
Moving in from West-II: AFC Ajax, Emma, HVV 't Gooi, RFC Rotterdam and VSV
Promoted from 2nd Division: DOS
Eerste Klasse West-II:
Moving in from West-I: DFC, DWS, HBS Craeyenhout, Sparta Rotterdam and Stormvogels
Promoted from 2nd Division: SC Neptunus

Divisions

Eerste Klasse East

Eerste Klasse North

Eerste Klasse South-I

Transferred to South-II Team moving to Division South-II next season.

Play-off

NAC qualified for the Championship Play-off.

Eerste Klasse South-II

Eerste Klasse West-I

Eerste Klasse West-II

Championship play-off

References
RSSSF Netherlands Football League Championships 1898-1954
RSSSF Eerste Klasse Oost
RSSSF Eerste Klasse Noord
RSSSF Eerste Klasse Zuid
RSSSF Eerste Klasse West

Netherlands Football League Championship seasons
1945–46 in Dutch football
Neth